The Baku Puppet Theatre (formally Azerbaijan State Puppet Theatre named after Abdulla Shaig) is located on Neftchiler Avenue of Baku. It was built in 1910 by Polish architect Józef Płoszko, initially as the French Renaissance "Phenomenon" movie theater.

The puppets vary in size from a few centimetres to double the size of a human.

Overview 
The theatre building was erected at the Baku Boulevard when there was no greenery yet. The exhaust ventilation system was superseded by forced ventilation. When the movie theater was opened to the public in June 1910, its administration advertised the features of full air change, occurring every 15 minutes and special ozonator.

Auditorium hall of the movie theater was 24 m. in length, 11 m. in width, 10 m. in height. 400 seats were available in parterre. Additionally there were 7 loges, and in upper section 3 verandas.

History

History of the building 
The first owner of “Phenomenon” cinema was M.Gofman. It was planning to rent the cinema hall for spectacles. Entrepreneurs were arranging a permission from city authorities to enlarge the building in the future. As a result, the architectural appearance of the building was completed by the monuments of 4 ancient mythological figures – Mercury, Bacchus, Poseidon and Aphrodite.

In 1921, according to project of Azerbaijani architect Zivar bey Ahmadbeyov the building was cardinally rebuilt for theatre "Satyragite".

“Phenomenon” operated as cinema, casino, Satyrogite theatre, Musical Comedy Theater and Museum of Agricultural Achievements till 1931.

History of Puppet Theatre 
The idea to establish Puppet Theatre in state level was introduced by the organizer of Theater Museum, actor Molla Agha Babirli. On the initiative of theater activists led by Jafar Jabbarly, Puppet Theatre was founded in 1931 by the decision of Education Commission. The first spectacle of the Theatre was “Circus” played in 1932.

Puppet Theatre operated independently in 1931–1941, and in 1946–1950, under Azerbaijan State Theatre of Young Spectators in 1941-1946 and Azerbaijan State Philharmonic Hall in 1950. In 1964 “State” status was given to the theatre.

Since 1975 plays for adult audience have been performing as well.

See also 
 Baku Boulevard
 Ganja Puppet Theatre
 Fenomen Cinematography Building

References

External links

 Azerbaijan State Puppet Theatre (official website)
 Seaside Boulevard Office (official website)
 Puppet Theatre in Baku screened from a drone. (video by Polish Embassy in Baku)

Puppet theaters
Buildings and structures in Baku
Theatres completed in 1910
Theatres in Baku
Tourist attractions in Baku